Anaerococcus is a genus of bacteria. Its type species is Anaerococcus prevotii. These bacteria are Gram-positive and strictly anaerobic. The genus Anaerococcus was proposed in 2001. Its genome was sequenced in August 2009. The genus Anaerococcus is one of six genera classified within the group GPAC (Gram-Positive Anaerobic Cocci). These six genera (Peptostreptococcus, Peptoniphilus, Parvimonas, Finegoldia, Murdochiella, and Anaerococcus) are found in the human body as part of the commensal human microbiota.

It is commonly found in the human microbiome and is associated with various infections. Most of the species in this genus can be found among microbes of the skin, human vagina, nasal cavity, oral cavity and feces, often as a pathogen found in ovarian abscesses, chronic wounds and vaginal discharge. Moreover, some of the species can be isolated from foot ulcers and knee arthritis. It can be present in urinary tract infections, chronic ulcers, pleural empyema, blood infections, and soft tissue infections. It is involved in polymicrobial infections. Strains of Anaerococcus were found in the armpit microbiota suggesting some species in this genus could play a role in axillary odor.

Physiology 
The genus Anaerococcus are non motile bacteria who can not form spores. Depending on the species the arrangement can be different. The most common arrangements within this genus are pairs, tetrads, short chains and irregular formations. Their cells size can differ from 0.6μm to 0.9μm. However, when they are grown using enrinched blood agar their size can go from 0.5μm to 2μm. In this genus, there a more than one major cellular fatty acids: C18:1, C16:1, C18 and C16. Most species in this genus are indole-negative and coaguase-negative. In general, the species of Anaerococcus presents susceptibility to penicillins but are resistant to tetracycline, erythromycin and clindamycin.

Metabolism 
The genus Anaerococcus are classified as saccharolytic bacteria. Its species can be arranged from weakly saccharolytic (ex. A. prevotii, A. lactolyticus) to strongly saccharolytic (ex. A. hydrogenalis). This genus can ferment carbohydrates weakly. The major sources of energy use in the metabolism of Anaerococcus are peptones and aminoacids. The three major sugars fermented within this genus are glucose, mannose, fructose and sucrose. After fermenting the sugars, Anaerococcus produce weak acids as their metabolic end product. Within these metabolic end products, this genus ca produce butyric acid, lactic acid, and some propionic and succinic acid.  Nonetheless, the major metabolite produced by Anaerococcus is butyrate.

Species
Until recently, the genus Anaerococcus have 14 known species. Six of the species were initially classified in the genus Peptostreptococcus but then based on their characteristics were re-classified in the new genus Anaerococcus: A. hydrogenalis, A. lactolyticus, A. octavius, A. prevotii, A. tetradius, and A. vaginalis. Throughout the years, the specie who has been more commonly found on the body within this genus is A. prevotii.

Anaerococcus octavius 
Contrary to most of the species in the genus, Anaerococcus octavius was not related to human infections. Nevertheless, recently a new case revealed A. octavius can cause bacteremia. Even though is uncommon, Anaerococcus octavius can be the cause for human infections. Other studies has found A. octavius as part of the nasal cavity, skin and vagina normal flora. This bacteria can ferment ribose, glucose, and mannose.

Anaerococcus prevotii 
A. prevotii is normally found in vaginal discharges, human plasma and some types of abscesses as ovarian, peritoneal sacral and/or lung abscesses. Even more, Anaerococcus prevotii is part of the normal flora in the skin, oral cavity and the gut. Studies has shown Anaerococcus prevotii presents resistance to Ceftazidime, Clindamycin, Levofloxacin. Unlike the other species, A. prevotii can not ferment glucose.

Anaerococcus vaginalis 
A. vaginalis was first recovered from vaginal discharges and ovarian abscesses although this bacteria can also be found in pressure ulcers and diabetic foot. Some strains from this specie can be indole-positive.

Anaerococcus provencensis 
A. provencensis was isolated from a cervical abscess. This specie can ferment lactose, unlike A. tetradius, A. prevotii, and A. octavius. The first analysis made on Anaerococcus provencensis showed it is susceptible to penicillin G, imipenem, amoxillin, metronidazole, cefotetan and vancomycin.

Anaerococcus senegalensis 
A. senegalensis is one of the few species in Anerococcus whose genome has been sequenced. The genome has a size of 1,790,835 bp. Analsis made did not show presence of a plasmid. Initially, Anaerococcus senegalensis was found in the fecal flora of a healthy person.

Anaerococcus rubiinfantis 
A. rubiinfantis was discovered from a stool sample taken from an infant with severe acute malnutrition in Senegal. Based on a genomic analysis, Anaerococcus rubiinfantis has high antibiotic susceptibility. For that reason this bacteria can be treated with common oral antibiotics. A. rubiinfantis have catalase activity, which is not common from an anaerobic bacteria.

Anaerococcus marasmi 
A. marasmi was first found in 2016 from a stool sample on a child with marasmus. Just like A. rubiinfantis, Anaerococcus marasmi is catalase positive. A. marasmi can grow in a range of pH between 6.5 and 8. Moreover, A. marasmi has a high sequence similarity (97.6%) with A. prevotii based on their 16S rRNA.

Anaerococcus urinomassiliensis 
A. urinomassiliensis was isolated from a urine sample of a male adolescent with membranoproliferative glomerulonephritis and autoinmune hepatitis. It took 10 days of anaerobic incubation to observe growth from this bacteria. Anaerococcus urinomassiliensis'' does not have either oxidase or catalase activity.

References 

Bacterial vaginosis
Peptoniphilaceae
Pathogenic bacteria
Microbiomes
Bacteria genera